The rufous-naped ground tyrant (Muscisaxicola rufivertex) is a species of bird in the family Tyrannidae.
It is found in Argentina, Bolivia, Chile, and Peru.
Its natural habitats are subtropical or tropical high-altitude shrubland and subtropical or tropical high-altitude grassland.

References

rufous-naped ground tyrant
Birds of Chile
Birds of the Puna grassland
Birds of Argentina
rufous-naped ground tyrant
Taxonomy articles created by Polbot